Constellation Prize may refer to:

Constellation Prize (album), 2013 album by Carbon Leaf
"Constellation Prize" (song), 2016 song by Swedish singer Robin Bengtsson